Dominik Nagy (born 8 May 1995) is a Hungarian professional footballer who plays as a winger for Mezőkövesd. He was also part of the Hungarian U-19 at the 2014 UEFA European Under-19 Championship and U-20 team at the 2015 FIFA U-20 World Cup.

Club career

Ferencváros
On 2 April 2016, Nagy became Hungarian League champion with Ferencvárosi TC after losing to Debreceni VSC 2–1 at the Nagyerdei Stadion in the 2015–16 Nemzeti Bajnokság I season.

Legia Warsaw
On 22 April 2017, Nagy scored his first goal in the 2016–17 Ekstraklasa season against Cracovia in the 18th minute at the Marshal Józef Piłsudski Stadium, Kraków, Poland.

Panathinaikos (loan)
On 14 January 2020, Panathinaikos officially announced the signing of Nagy on a six-month loan.

Legia Warsaw II
After returning from loan in Panathinaikos, Dominik Nagy has joined the Legia Warsaw's reserve team. The coaching staff stated that they did not see a place for him in the first team. Eventually, he did not appear in any of the 2020–21 season games.

Budapest Honvéd
On 19 January 2021, he joined the Hungarian club Budapest Honvéd.

Mezőkövesd
On 17 January 2023, Nagy signed with Mezőkövesd.

International career
Nagy was part of the Hungarian U-20 team at the 2015 FIFA U-20 World Cup, playing in four games. He made his debut for U-21 team against Finland U21 on 13 November 2014.
In November 2016 Nagy received his first call-up to the senior Hungary squad for matches against Andorra and Sweden, and he made his debut against second one.

International goals
Scores and results list Hungary's goal tally first.

Career statistics

Club

References

External links
 Profile at HLSZ 
 Profile at MLSZ 
 
 

1995 births
Sportspeople from Baranya County
Living people
Hungarian footballers
Hungary youth international footballers
Hungary under-21 international footballers
Hungary international footballers
Association football midfielders
Pécsi MFC players
Kozármisleny SE footballers
Ferencvárosi TC footballers
Legia Warsaw players
Panathinaikos F.C. players
Budapest Honvéd FC players
Mezőkövesdi SE footballers
Nemzeti Bajnokság I players
Nemzeti Bajnokság II players
Ekstraklasa players
Super League Greece players
III liga players
Hungarian expatriate footballers
Expatriate footballers in Poland
Hungarian expatriate sportspeople in Poland
Expatriate footballers in Greece
Hungarian expatriate sportspeople in Greece